Paris Métro Line 8 (French: Ligne 8 du métro de Paris) is one of the sixteen lines of the Paris Métro. It connects Balard in the southwestern part of Paris to Pointe du Lac station in the southeastern suburbs, following a parabolic route on the Rive Droite of the Seine. The last line of the original 1898 Paris Métro plan, which opened in July 1913, it was initially intended to link Porte d'Auteuil and Opéra. With 105.5 million travellers in 2017, it is the network's eighth busiest line; at 23.4 km (14.5 mi) of length, it is also the second longest Métro Line after Line 13. Along with Line 7, it serves the most stations of any line on the network, at 38. Line 8 interchanges with all but three other Métro lines (Line 2, Line 3bis and Line 7bis).

The line was substantially modified during the 1930s as Line 10 took over the western section. The current route serves the southwestern part of the city, the Grands Boulevards and Bois de Vincennes, ending in the southeastern inner suburbs through the communes of Charenton-le-Pont, Maisons-Alfort and Créteil, which the line reached in 1974 at Créteil – Préfecture station, after several extensions. The underground line was the first to connect the prefecture of one of the new departments of Île-de-France. The only Paris underground line to cross the Seine and its principal tributary, the Marne, above ground via a bridge between Charenton – Écoles and École Vétérinaire de Maisons-Alfort, it also crosses the Seine underground between Concorde and Invalides.

History

Timeline

13 July 1913: Line 8 opened between Beaugrenelle and Opéra.
30 September 1913: Line extended from Beaugrenelle to Porte d'Auteuil.
30 June 1928: Northern extension from Opéra to Richelieu-Drouot
5 May 1931: Line extended from Richelieu-Drouot to Porte de Charenton.
27 July 1937: Section between La Motte-Picquet and Porte d'Auteuil transferred to Line 10; Line 8 extended from La Motte-Picquet to Balard.
2 September 1939: Like many other stations, service to Saint-Martin and Champ de Mars was halted because of World War II; both stations were eventually closed.
5 October 1942: Line extended eastbound from Porte de Charenton to Charenton – Écoles.
19 September 1970: Line extended from Charenton – Écoles to Maisons-Alfort – Stade.
27 April 1972: Line extended from Maisons-Alfort – Stade to Maisons-Alfort – Les Juillottes.
24 September 1973: Line extended from Maisons-Alfort – Les Julliottes to Créteil – l'Echat.
9 September 1974: Line extended from Créteil – l'Echat to Créteil – Préfecture.
8 October 2011: Line extended from Créteil – Préfecture to Pointe du Lac.

Birth of the line

Line 8 was the last line created by the concession of 30 March 1898, and the déclaration d'utilité publique was approved on 6 April 1903. The project would connect Opéra with Porte d'Auteuil via Grenelle with a shuttle, similar to the network's other lines. In accordance with the plan to operate Line 7 with a junction on the outskirts of Paris, a branch towards the Porte de Sèvres (today Balard) starting from the Grenelle station was planned to be built subsequently. The trains would alternately run on the two branches.

Construction of the underwater crossing of the Seine began in April 1908 between the Concorde and Invalides stations, at the level of Pont Mirabeau. It was finished in January 1911, after a lengthy delay caused by the 1910 flood. The crossing was routed with a curve 250 metres away.

Although metal caissons were originally planned to be sunk vertically (as had been done on Line 4), a tunnel was drilled following a single circular tube with the aid of a shield; authorities opposed the first method because of the risks to boating. However, the crossing near Pont Mirabeau was made with vertical caissons. The Invalides-Javel section was completed in 1910. The Grenelle station was planned as a double station with platforms on two levels, with the aim to later send trains on the two branches. However, only one station with a central platform was built, as the Balard branch was planned to be built later.

Before the completion of work near Pont Mirabeau, the line opened to the public on 13 July 1913 between Beaugrenelle and Opéra; the extension to Porte d'Auteuil followed on 30 September. The Invalides and Concorde stations were still unfinished and opened on 24 December 1913 and 12 March 1914, respectively. In 1914, the line had fifteen stations between Porte d'Auteuil and Opéra.

First extensions
Extension of the line began on 29 December 1922, intending to transform Line 8 into a parabolic axis connecting Auteuil to Porte de Charenton via Opéra, Place de la République, Place de la Bastille, Avenue Daumesnil in the 12th arrondissement and Porte de Picpus. As part of the extension, a common route with Line 9 between the Richelieu – Drouot and République stations was planned in order to limit the impact of this problematic section on street traffic. Located on the former course of the Seine, the ground is soft and the initial plan to build two parallel tunnels generated lengthy controversy.

The first new section opened on 30 June 1928, extending the line by 643 meters to Richelieu – Drouot from Opéra. With an increase in traffic forecast, at its 21 March 1926 meeting the Municipal Council of Paris decided to increase the new Line 7, 8 and 9 station length from 75 metres to 105 to use stock seven-car trains. Although lengthening the old stations was planned later, the work was never completed. The new Richelieu – Drouot station was the system's first 105-metre station, but train length was limited by the shorter stations.

The 1931 Paris Colonial Exposition in Bois de Vincennes necessitated the completion of Line 8 for its opening. The extension of the line to Porte de Charenton, including the construction of seventeen 105-metre stations, was agreed on 25 March 1924 and work began in 1928. The configuration of Lines 8 and 9, under the Grands Boulevards in wet, unstable ground, drove the decision to extend the line on two levels. The Line 8 stations are on the upper level: two half-stations, separated by a central supporting wall to ensure stability. The 7.8-km extension was completed in March 1931 and opened to the public on 5 May, ending at Porte de Charenton. The line now included thirty-three stations between Auteuil and Porte de Charenton.

Major restructuring

The line's southwestern portion was modified during the 1930s, with the system's circular lines replaced by axes crossing the city. Instead of connecting the Bois de Boulogne and the Bois de Vincennes, Line 8 connected Balard and Porte de Charenton. The La Motte-Picquet was modified so trains departed only for Balard, instead of alternating between Auteuil and Balard.

The changes affected several lines; Line 8 had a new terminus at Balard, and the old section the line between La Motte-Picquet and Porte d'Auteuil was reassigned to Line 10. With Line 10 ending at Invalides, the section between Duroc and Invalides was transferred to the old Line 14 (now Line 13).

The section between La Motte-Picquet and Balard opened on 27 July 1937, at the same time as the Javel maintenance workshop. At that time, the line included thirty-one stations between Balard and Porte de Charenton.

Second wave of extensions toward Créteil
The extension to Charenton-le-Pont was approved on 24 December 1929. Work began in 1936, and a  opened on 5 October 1942. Two new stations were created: Liberté and Charenton – Écoles in Charenton-le-Pont. Although in 1942 the line had thirty-three stations, Champ de Mars and Saint-Martin were closed on 2 September 1939.

After the war, the only metro extension was Line 13 (to Carrefour Pleyel) in 1952. Investment programmes in 1965 and 1967 envisaged three extensions. One was Line 8 to Maisons-Alfort, due to overcrowding at Charenton-le-Pont which disrupted bus service to Charenton. The extension required crossing the Marne on a viaduct, since the Charenton – Écoles station was at the edge of a cliff north of the river.

A concrete, 199-metre viaduct was built in spring 1968. Aesthetically designed to integrate with the landscape, it has six supports (including one of its three piers in the river. The two central spans are 55.5 metres long, and the two side spans 30 metres long. The structural steel is a continuous metal beam, supported by two vertical beams. These beams frame the bottom of the trains, and the rails are laid on track ballast, for noise reduction. On the north, the viaduct overhangs the A4 autoroute before going underground on a 100-metre access ramp. On the south, the line immediately goes underground on a 70-metre ramp. The viaduct has a continuous slope of 40 mm/m, enabling it to go underground when it crosses the left bank of the Marne. In June 1969 the metal beams were put in place, and the structure was completed in November.

This viaduct, the first built since the Line 6 viaduct in 1909, leads to a three-track tunnel to the terminus. The section from Charenton – Écoles to Maisons-Alfort – Stade opened on 19 September 1970.

Extension to Créteil

Créteil became a prefecture after the creation of the department of Val-de-Marne, resulting in an increase in population, and a new extension was quickly begun in several stages. The line reached Maisons-Alfort – Les Juilliottes on 27 April 1972 in a tunnel. It enters Créteil on 2-km, open-air tracks in the median of a highway. The Créteil – L'Échat station, with a central platform, opened on 24 September 1973; Créteil – Préfecture, with three tracks and two platforms, opened on 10 September 1974.

The extensions triggered a change from a single fare to fares by section on 19 September 1970, when the extension to Maisons-Alfort – Stade opened. Stations are equipped with an automatic check at the exit with a turnstile, and travellers paid a supplementary fare to exit. The system returned to a single fare on 1 November 1982.

Line 8 is the site of the first unsolved crime in the history of the métro, which was widely reported. On 16 May 1937 around 18:30, passengers at the Porte Dorée station discovered 29-year-old Laetitia Toureaux (an Italian-French widow of a Parisian craftsman) stabbed in a first-class carriage where she was alone. The inquiry, conducted by the police chief, revealed that the woman led a varied life: working under a false name for a detective agency, frequently (and discreetly) visiting the Italian embassy and checking coats at a dance hall. La Cagoule was suspected, but war broke out two years later and the case was closed unsolved. The story inspired Pierre Siniac to write Le Crime du dernier métro, a 2001 novel.

Route and stations

Route

It is the second-longest line (after Line 13), with the greatest distance between its terminals.

The line begins in 15th arrondissement of Paris at the level of the Porte de Sèvres. The rear station at Balard is under the Paris heliport, beyond the Boulevard Périphérique viaduct. The station has three tracks and a central platform, with the end of the line supplemented by four parking tracks.

It then runs toward Hôtel des Invalides along Avenue Félix-Faure, passing under the Chemin de fer de Petite Ceintureviaduct and arriving at the Lourmel station (three tracks with platforms, one of which runs to the Javel maintenance workshop. It then serves the Boucicaut and Félix Faure stations.

After these stations, Line 8 follows the Rue du Commerce. Because of the narrowness of the street, the Commerce station has staggered platforms. At the intersection of Rue du Commerce and Avenue Emile-Zola, the Line 8 tunnel is under Line 10 in a common structure. As the line reaches the La Motte-Picquet – Grenelle station, the eastbound Lines 8 (toward Créteil – Préfecture) and 10 (toward Austerlitz) use the same central platform; the westbound Line 8 (toward Balard) is under the westbound Line 10 for historical reasons.

The line then follows Avenue de la Motte-Picquet at a .04-percent grade, bringing it near the surface. The Champ de Mars station, between La Motte-Picquet – Grenelle and École Militaire, was closed on 2 September 1939. A rush-hour track, unusual in the system, and a connection are between the La Motte-Picquet – Grenelle and Champ de Mars stations.

After the Champ de Mars ghost station the line serves École Militaire and La Tour-Maubourg, curving right and left under the Invalides esplanade and beginning a .04-percent descent under the park tracks and the main tracks of Line 13 to the Invalides station under the Rue de Constantine. At Rue Robert-Esnault-Pelterie, it begins a second .04-percent descent under RER Line C to cross the Seine through a metal tunnel. The line then goes up the Right Bank on a curved, .035-percent grade to the Concorde station.

Line 8 then runs under Rue Royale, under the Asnières sewage-treatment plant and then above Line 12, to reach Madeleine. It crosses Line 14, passing the Clichy sewage-treatment plant to Opera before skirting the Grands Boulevards to Richelieu – Drouot. At this station Lines 8 and 9 begin a common infrastructure, with Line 8 above Line 9.

Both lines reach the same level at République, via Grands Boulevards, Bonne Nouvelle, Strasbourg – Saint-Denis and the closed Saint Martin station. On the east side of République the tunnel widens to three and then four tracks, used by both lines for connections on the west side of the station.

The line continues under the Grands Boulevards to Bastille, via Filles du Calvaire, Saint-Sébastien – Froissart and Chemin Vert. Before arriving at Bastille, it descends under Line 5 and Canal Saint-Martin at a .40-percent grade. The line then follows the Rue du Fauborg-Saint-Antoine to the Ledru-Rollin and Faidherbe – Chaligny stations, curving to follow the Rue de Reuilly to the Reuilly – Diderot station.

Line 8 reaches Montgallet on a .04-percent grade before the Bois de Vincennes, via the Daumesnil, Michel Bizot and Porte Dorée stations. It then turns southwest to the Porte of Charenton station. The line then turns southeast, leaving Paris to cross the commune of Charenton-le-Pont via the Liberté and Charenton – Écoles stations. This station has two tracks with platforms and two sidings, since it was a longtime terminus.

The line continues in open air for 353 meters before crossing the A4 autoroute and the Marne. The viaduct is two metal, 199-metre structures, with a slope of .04014 percent. Line 8 goes underground again through Maisons-Alfort along Avenue Général-Leclerc, via the École Vétérinaire de Maisons-Alfort, Maisons-Alfort – Stade and Maisons-Alfort – Les Juilliottes stations. The latter, a former terminus, has three tracks with a platform and a depot.

Line 8 then has three tracks to its terminus. Before arriving at Créteil – L'Échat, it crosses the Route nationale 19-A86 autoroute interchange and continues in open air. The tracks, along CD 1, serve the Créteil – Université and Créteil – Préfecture stations.

In a planned future extension, Line 8 will continue south past the intersection of CD 1 and CD 60 to a new station. The line will continue to stop behind the Stade Dominique Duvauchelle at Créteil, where a new maintenance shop will be located.

List of stations

Line 8 has 38 stations, including 13 which connect to 12 other Métro and two RER lines.

Renamed stations
Five stations on the line have been renamed:

Themed and unique stations
La Motte-Picquet – Grenelle's connecting passageways are decorated with coats of arms of the Toussaint-Guillaume Picquet de la Motte family. A fresco depicting the toll barrier of the Cunette, one of the entrances of the Wall of the Farmers, was previously located here.

Richelieu – Drouot has a black marble war memorial dedicated to metropolitan railway employees mort pour la France, sculpted by Carlo Sarrabezolles in 1931. The central pillar is a caryatid, who supports the surrounding stone with her raised arms. The caryatid divides the names of subway employees killed during World War I into two half-circles. The monument's base contains the names of the Great War battlefields, and the word "Release" was added to the bottom right after World War II to commemorate employee participation in the French Resistance.

Bonne Nouvelle was redecorated in a cinematic theme for the Métro's centennial. The station's name is written in the style of the Hollywood Sign in Los Angeles.

Some stations still show signs of difficulty in construction or integration into urban space:
 Commerce has offset platforms because of the narrowness of the Rue du Commerce.
 The platforms at La Motte-Picquet – Grenelle do not face each other because of the original role of the station, serving the d'Auteuil and Balard branches. The platform to Balard is below and shifted slightly with respect to the Créteil platform.
 Champ de Mars and Saint-Martin are two ghost stations, closed on 2 September 1939.
 République is a part-time terminus.
 Porte de Charenton, an old terminus, has four tracks with platforms: two sidings framed by the two main tracks.
 Charenton – Écoles, another old terminus, includes two tracks with a platform and two sidings.
 Maisons-Alfort – Les Juilliottes, like the two preceding stations, has three tracks with a platform; the middle one is a part-time terminus.
 Créteil – L'Échat and Créteil – Université are two-track stations framing a central platform.

Connections

The lines has eight connections with other lines in the system:
 Line 10 between École Militaire and La Motte-Picquet – Grenelle toward Balard, facing the exit of the closed Champ de Mars station
 Line 13 – Two connections in the Invalides complex: one (made into a reception area) between Invalides and Concorde toward Créteil – Préfecture, and the other facing the La Tour-Maubourg entrance toward Balard
 Line 1, facing the exit of Concorde toward Balard
 Line 5 between République and Strasbourg – Saint-Denis, at the entrance of the closed Saint-Martin station toward Balard
 Line 9 – Two connections: between Strasbourg – Saint-Denis and République (both tracks) and a crossover at République (Line 9) and Strasbourg – Saint-Denis (Line 8)
 Line 6 between Daumesnil and Montgallet toward Balard, trailing

Tourism

Line 8 runs near several points of interest in Paris:
 École militaire, the Champ de Mars and the Eiffel Tower (École Militaire station)
 Invalides, including the tomb of Napoléon Bonaparte (Invalides station)
 Place de la Concorde, including the Obelisk and the Tuileries (Concorde)
 Church of the Madeleine (Madeleine)
 The Opera Garnier (Opéra)
 The Grands Boulevards (between Madeleine and République)
 Place de la République (République)
 The Bastille and its adjacent modern opera house, the Opéra Bastille (Bastille)
 Cité nationale de l'histoire de l'immigration and the Aquarium of the Palais de la Porte Dorée (Porte Dorée)
 The Bois de Vincennes and Paris Zoological Park (four stations between Porte Dorée and Charenton – Écoles)

Further east, the line passes points of interest in Val-de-Marne:
 The museum of the École nationale vétérinaire d'Alfort (École Vétérinaire de Maisons-Alfort)
 The museum of Maisons-Alfort (Maisons-Alfort – Les Juilliottes)
 Créteil Soleil Mall (Créteil – Préfecture)

See also

References

External links

  RATP official website
  RATP english speaking website
  Interactive Map of the RER (from RATP's website)
  Interactive Map of the Paris métro (from RATP's website)
  Metro-Pole website, dedicated to Paris public transports (unofficial)

1913 establishments in France
 
Railway lines opened in 1913
Railway lines in highway medians